Keith Barish (born November 11, 1944) is an American film producer.  He is known for being the former restaurateur of Planet Hollywood, which he co-founded with Robert Earl in 1991.  He also served as the producer of such films as Sophie's Choice (1982), The Running Man (1987) and The Fugitive (1993).  Barish also produced the film Ironweed (1987).

Life and career
Barish was born in Los Angeles.  He moved to Miami at the age of three, when his parents divorced.

Following a start in his career in real estate development, Barish officially became a film producer in 1979 and first produced the film Endless Love (1981), followed by Sophie's Choice (1982). He then subsequently set up a nine-picture production deal at 20th Century-Fox through a three-year alliance via the Keith Barish Productions banner.

Barish then served as chairman of Taft Entertainment/Keith Barish Productions, which he co-founded in 1984 with a subsidiary of Taft Broadcasting, with 20th Century-Fox intended as film distributor, then Tri-Star Pictures took over Fox's duties.

On December 31, 1985, Taft-Barish Productions inked an agreement with Producers Sales Organization (later the duties were assumed by J&M Entertainment after PSO went bankrupt) to handle worldwide sales of its own films, with Tri-Star Pictures handling film distribution. On August 13, 1986, film director Taylor Hackford, filed a lawsuit against Keith Barish's production company for breaching an agreement to co-develop the film At Play in the Fields of the Lord, with Barrish getting a development option from MGM/UA. At one point, Barish was attached to produce The Flintstones (1994).

On August 20, 1986, Taft/Barish Productions had inked a $200 million agreement with Tri-Star Pictures to handle four to six films per year, with production and distribution costs will be funded entirely by Taft/Barish, a joint venture of Taft Motion Pictures and Keith Barish Productions. On October 8, 1986, Rob Cohen was appointed vice chairman of Keith Barish's production company, and served as executive producer on most of the Taft-Barish projects. In August 1987, Taft-Barish Productions and Tri-Star Pictures decided to scale down projects from four-to-six to two-to-three projects yearly, with a new emphasis on higher budgeted, high quality films, rather than having a previous mixture of various product that the original agreement had to offer. In October 1987, ahead of MIFED, the international film rights to the Taft-Barish projects in a group package were picked up by J&M Entertainment, a foreign sales distributor, after the collapse of defunct film distributor Producers Sales Organization, and certain sales of the Taft-Barish projects were assigned to another Taft Broadcasting subsidiary Worldvision Enterprises, which will retain film and television rights on the four Taft-Barish group pictures.

In 1991, Barish and Robert Earl co-founded Planet Hollywood.  Barish left Planet Hollywood in 1999.

Barish is married to socialite Ann Barish.  They have a son, Chris.

Filmography
He was a producer in all films unless otherwise noted.

Film

As an actor

Thanks

Television

As an actor

References

External links
 

People from Los Angeles
American restaurateurs
Film producers from Florida
1944 births
Living people
People from Miami